Bismarck is a rural unincorporated community and census-designated place (CDP) in Hot Spring County, Arkansas. It was first listed as a CDP in the 2020 census with a population of 229. It is located between Hot Springs and Caddo Valley, centered around the intersection of State Hwy 7 and State Hwy 84 in Hot Spring County, Arkansas, United States.

Demographics

2020 census

Note: the US Census treats Hispanic/Latino as an ethnic category. This table excludes Latinos from the racial categories and assigns them to a separate category. Hispanics/Latinos can be of any race.

Education
Public education is provided by the Bismarck School District, which provides elementary and secondary education.

References

Unincorporated communities in Hot Spring County, Arkansas
Unincorporated communities in Arkansas
Census-designated places in Hot Spring County, Arkansas
Census-designated places in Arkansas